St Mary's College, Toowoomba is an independent Catholic senior primary and secondary school for boys, located in Newtown, Toowoomba, Queensland, Australia. The College was established by the Congregation of Christian Brothers in 1899 and is a member of Edmund Rice Education Australia. In 2016, the school had an enrolment of 851 students from Years 5 to 12. St Mary's College has an iPad program to improve learning.

Subjects 
St Mary's College offers a wide range of subjects, including arts, drama, English, foreign languages (Japanese and Spanish), graphics, humanities, I.T.E, maths, music, P.E, religion, science, and wood tech and metal tech.

English is the most spoken language, although Dinka, German, Portuguese and Indonesian are spoken by more than 100 students. English, Japanese and Spanish are taught at the school.

Notable alumni 

 Sir Walter Campbell a former Governor of Queensland, jurist and barrister
 Virgil Patrick Copas appointed Archbishop of Port Moresby in 1966
 Joseph Anthony (Tony) Dietzair vice-marshall; senior engineer officer in the Royal Australian Air Force
 Ian “Ripper” Doylerugby league player; played for the Kangaroos
 Frank Forde politician; the 15th Prime Minister of Australia, serving only eight days in office in 1945
Peter Gillrugby league player
 Tom Gormanrugby league player; captained the Kangaroos in 1929-30
 Harold Hawkins air vice-marshall; appointed air advisor to Rhodesian High Commissioner and Chief of Air Staff – 1955
 Graham Healylocal radio announcer and politician; former Member for Toowoomba North
 Michael Katsidisboxer
 Stathi Katsidisjockey; multiple Brisbane premiership-winner
 Vince Lester former politician; served for 30 years (1974 – 2004); former National Party minister
 Ben Lowerugby league player
 Jaiman Lowerugby league player 
 Catherine McGregor prominent transgender writer, activist, and former Australian Defence Force officer 
 Neil ‘Digger’ McGrowdiejockey; won 1957 Melbourne Cup on ‘Straight Draw’
 Jake Simpkinrugby league player
 Johnathan Thurstonrugby league player; dual Dally M Medal winner (2005 & 2007); represented Queensland and the Kangaroos
 Ben Walkerrugby league player
Chris Walkerrugby league player
 Shane Walkerrugby league player

References

Boys' schools in Queensland
Congregation of Christian Brothers secondary schools in Australia
Catholic secondary schools in Queensland
Schools in Toowoomba
Educational institutions established in 1899
1899 establishments in Australia
Roman Catholic Diocese of Toowoomba
Congregation of Christian Brothers primary schools in Australia
Newtown, Queensland (Toowoomba)
Catholic primary schools in Queensland